Borj-e Akram Rural District is a rural district (dehestan) in the Central District of Fahraj County, Kerman Province, Iran. At the 2006 census, its population was 9,465, in 2,224 families. The rural district has 27 villages.

References 

Rural Districts of Kerman Province
Fahraj County